Mayo Hibi was the defending champion but chose to compete at the 2021 BNP Paribas Open instead.

Emina Bektas won the title, defeating Yuriko Lily Miyazaki in the final, 6–1, 6–1.

Seeds

Draw

Finals

Top half

Bottom half

References

Main Draw

Henderson Tennis Open - Singles